John Christopher Sagelhurst (June 1, 1841 - May 10, 1907) was an American soldier who fought in the American Civil War. Sagelhurst received his country's highest award for bravery during combat, the Medal of Honor. Sagelhurst's medal was won for his gallantry at the Battle of Hatcher's Run in Virginia on February 6, 1865. He was honored with the award on January 3, 1906.

Sagelhurst was born in Buffalo, New York, entered service in Jersey City, New Jersey, and was later buried in Buffalo.

Medal of Honor citation

See also
List of American Civil War Medal of Honor recipients: Q–S

References

1841 births
1907 deaths
American Civil War recipients of the Medal of Honor
People of New York (state) in the American Civil War
Military personnel from Buffalo, New York
Union Army officers
United States Army Medal of Honor recipients